Acro or ACRO may refer to:

 Acro dance, a dance style that combines classical dance technique with acrobatics
 Acro Sport, an aircraft manufacturer
 Grob 103 Twin II Acro, a sailplane manufactured by Grob Aircraft
 ACRO (ACPO Criminal Records Office), an ancillary body of the British police
 Helenius Acron or Acro, an ancient Roman writer

See also
 Acron (disambiguation)